{{DISPLAYTITLE:C18H14Cl4N2O}}
The molecular formula C18H14Cl4N2O (molar mass: 416.13 g/mol, exact mass: 413.9860 u) may refer to:

 Isoconazole
 Miconazole

Molecular formulas